"All God's Chillun Got Rhythm" is a 1937 jazz standard. It was written by Walter Jurmann, Gus Kahn and Bronisław Kaper especially for Ivie Anderson, who performed it in the Marx Brothers' 1937 film A Day at the Races, the tune was also used for the opening theme.

The lyrics state that "All God's Children Got Rhythm" even if they "maybe haven't got money, maybe haven't got shoes". The authors (European immigrants from Poland, Germany, and Austria) were likely influenced by a traditional Negro spiritual "All God's Chillun Got Wings" alternately called "All God's Children Got Shoes" which affirms that all God's children have shoes. This was the inspiration for a Eugene O'Neill play of the same name in the 1924 and recorded by Paul Robeson, who also appeared in the play.

See also
List of jazz standards

References

External links
 Ivey Anderson performing the song in an excerpt from the Marx Brothers film A Day at the Races (1937)

Songs with music by Bronisław Kaper
Songs with lyrics by Gus Kahn
1930s jazz standards
1937 songs